was a town located in Minamiakita District, Akita Prefecture, Japan.

In 2003, the town had an estimated population of 7,310 and a density of 171.40 persons per km². The total area was 42.65 km².

On March 22, 2005, Wakami was merged into the expanded city of Oga.

Wakami's main crops were rice, melons, tobacco, flowers, grapes, and potatoes

Sister city
Livingston, California

External links
Merced Sun-Star article about sister city relationship
 Oga official website 

Dissolved municipalities of Akita Prefecture
Oga, Akita